The 1995 American League Championship Series (ALCS), the second round of the 1995 American League playoffs, matched the Central Division champion Cleveland Indians against the West Division champion Seattle Mariners. The Mariners had the home field advantage, which was predetermined and assigned to either the West Division champion or their opponents in the Division Series.

The two teams were victorious in the AL Division Series (ALDS), with the Indians defeating the East Division champion Boston Red Sox three games to none, and the Mariners defeating the wild card qualifier New York Yankees three games to two. The Indians won the series four games to two to become the American League champions, and lost to the National League champion Atlanta Braves in the 1995 World Series.

Background

Mariners
The summer of 1995 proved to be the most pivotal stretch in Seattle Mariners history. In fact, many consider this the season and the team that saved the Mariners from relocation out of Seattle. An expansion team created as a result of a breach of contract lawsuit involving the Seattle Pilots' 1969 departure after just one year in Seattle, the Mariners had been a doormat franchise, finishing with a losing record every year until 1991 (by then their 15th season as a franchise). By 1995, they had just recorded two winning record seasons with no postseason appearances.

There was also an issue with the stadium, the Kingdome, which was a multipurpose domed stadium that had become well outdated by the mid-1990s. This became even more apparent in late July 1994 when tiles fell from the ceiling 30 minutes before the stadium was set to open for a game against the Baltimore Orioles, forcing the Mariners to play the rest of what would be a short season on the road. It was clear by the start of the 1995 season, the Mariners needed a new stadium in Seattle or they would be moved to a city that could provide them one. 

With this as the backdrop heading into the strike-shortened 1995 season, the Mariners won their first division title, in part due to a historic collapse from the California Angels. The Angels were leading the American League West by 10½-game lead over the Texas Rangers and an 11½-game lead over the Seattle Mariners on August 16th and were still atop the division, leading Seattle by 6 games and Texas by 7½, when a nine-game losing streak from September 13 to 23 dropped them out of first place. The Mariners beat the Angels in a one-game playoff and then beat the Yankees in a thrilling five game series in the ALDS to get to their first ALCS in franchise history.

The team was affectionately nicknamed the "Refuse to Lose" Mariners.

Indians
The story of lack of team success and stadium funding could have also been the same for the Cleveland Indians, prior to 1994. Since the 1954 World Series, the Indians had not made the postseason, which included a stretch from 1977 to 1989 where they placed fourth or worst every year. Like the Seattle Mariners, the Indians also played in a multi-purpose stadium that had its warts. Cleveland Stadium, who also homed the Cleveland Browns, had been the Indians’ home since 1932. By the early 1990s the stadium's inadequacy was becoming apparent in any event; chunks of concrete were falling off and the pilings were starting to petrify. In May 1990, Cuyahoga County voters approved funding for a new Gateway Sports and Entertainment Complex, which included the new ballpark, an adjacent arena for the Cleveland Cavaliers of the National Basketball Association (NBA), and two parking garages.

When the Indians moved into Jacobs Field (now named Progressive Field) in 1994, success immediately followed. By the time of the season ended in 1994 due to the players' strike, the Indians were 66-47 and in a postseason spot as a wildcard. The Indians carried over the success into the 1995 season where they won the American League Central by a whopping 30 games.

Summary

Seattle Mariners vs. Cleveland Indians

Game summaries

Game 1
Tuesday, October 10, 1995, at Kingdome in Seattle, Washington

The Indians called on the veteran Dennis Martínez for Game 1. The Mariners rode the arm of rookie Bob Wolcott. Obviously nervous at the outset, Wolcott walked the first three hitters on 13 pitches, but he would get out of the bases-loaded, nobody-out situation with ease; he first struck out Albert Belle, got Eddie Murray on a foul pop-fly, then induced a groundout from Jim Thome on a great diving stop by Joey Cora. In the second, Mike Blowers hit a two-run homer to put the Mariners in front, 2–0. However, the Indians would put together a run in the next inning and in the seventh, Belle's homer tied the game at two. With Martinez still pitching in a tie game, the Mariners would take the lead thanks to Luis Sojo's go-ahead double in the bottom half of the seventh. Norm Charlton would come on in the eighth for a  inning save. He would retire the side in order in the ninth, and the Mariners took Game 1.

Game 2
Wednesday, October 11, 1995, at Kingdome in Seattle, Washington

The Indians' second veteran Orel Hershiser was called upon to stem the tide against Tim Belcher. Both pitchers dueled for four innings until the Indians broke through in the top of the fifth with a two-run single by Carlos Baerga. In the next inning, the Indians grabbed two more on a Manny Ramírez homer and an RBI triple by Sandy Alomar Jr. Ken Griffey Jr.'s sixth postseason homer put the Mariners on the board to make it 4–1 in the bottom of the sixth. The Indians would put the game away when Manny Ramírez hit his second homer of the game in the eighth to make it 5–1. Hershiser would give way to José Mesa in the ninth. Mesa would issue a one-out homer to Jay Buhner but would recover to close out the win. With the victory, Hershiser raised his postseason record to 6–0 with a 1.47 ERA in  innings.

Game 3
Friday, October 13, 1995, at Jacobs Field in Cleveland, Ohio

In Game 3, the starting pitchers were Randy Johnson and Charles Nagy. Nagy and Johnson pitched a scoreless first but the Mariners broke through on a homer by Jay Buhner. Then an error in the third by Álvaro Espinoza gave the Mariners one more run to make it 2–0 Seattle. The Indians put a run on the board after a leadoff triple by Kenny Lofton and a sac fly by Omar Vizquel in the fourth. In the bottom of the eighth, Buhner missed a deep fly ball to right; Lofton then singled through the left side to tie the game at two. The game moved to extra innings and in the 11th, Buhner, whose miscue tied the game, got sweet redemption with a three-run home run to give the Mariners a 5–2 lead. Charlton, pitching in relief since the ninth inning, got the win and shut down the Indians in the bottom of the 11th.

Game 4
Saturday, October 14, 1995, at Jacobs Field in Cleveland, Ohio

With their backs to the wall in Game 4, Cleveland called on Ken Hill to help tie the series. Opposing him would be Andy Benes. Benes wouldn't fare well against Hill and the Cleveland hitters. The Indians put three on the board in the first, a rally capped by Murray's two-run homer. A sac fly by Kenny Lofton made it 4–0 in the second. Then the rain began to fall on Seattle's parade in the third as Benes surrendered a two-run homer to Jim Thome in the rain. Benes was done and the rain ended after the third was over. Hill would pitch beyond expectations and lead his team to an easy 7–0 shutout.

Game 5
Sunday, October 15, 1995, at Jacobs Field in Cleveland, Ohio

Game 5 was a matchup between Chris Bosio and Orel Hershiser. Hershiser was looking to continue his excellence and he got help quickly when the Indians knocked home a run in the first thanks to an error by Tino Martinez. But Hershiser's slim lead would be cut in the third when Ken Griffey Jr.'s RBI double tied the game. In the fifth, an error by Belle gave the Mariners the lead. The Mariners were closing in on a 3–2 series lead going home, but the Indians wouldn't allow it as Thome stepped to the plate in the sixth with a man on and hit a two-run homer to give the lead back to the Indians. The Mariners had their share of chances; in the seventh, they had men on the corners with one out and Griffey at the plate. Paul Assenmacher was summoned from the bullpen. He proceeded to strike out Griffey on a high fastball, then Jay Buhner stepped to the plate. In this situation, manager Mike Hargrove would usually bring in a right-hander, but he stayed with Assenmacher. He struck out Buhner on a low breaking ball and then slowly, stoically walked off the mound, with 40,000 fans screaming wildly. The Mariners could not capitalize on any more opportunities and José Mesa closed the door in the ninth.

Game 6
Tuesday, October 17, 1995, at Kingdome in Seattle, Washington

In the potential clincher, Dennis Martínez faced Randy Johnson. Both pitchers kept the game scoreless until the top of the fifth. A key error by Joey Cora allowed Kenny Lofton to single home a run to put the Indians up. With the score still 1–0 in the eighth, the Indians put three runs together against Johnson. A passed ball with two men in scoring position allowed both of them to score. Kenny Lofton made a mad dash from second base, sliding in just ahead of the tag from Johnson, and the entire Cleveland dugout ran onto the field to celebrate. Then Carlos Baerga followed with a homer to give the Indians a commanding 4–0 lead with six outs to go. Once again, José Mesa came on to close the door in the ninth and did so with ease. The Indians had won their first pennant since 1954. The Mariners were one of the very few teams to have lost in two shutouts in one series. Orel Hershiser was selected as the Most Valuable Player of the ALCS. He became the first player to win the LCS MVP Award in both leagues, having previously done so in 1988 for the Los Angeles Dodgers.

Composite box
1995 ALCS (4–2): Cleveland Indians over Seattle Mariners

Aftermath

Mariners

By the time of their American League Division Series meeting with the Yankees,  Washington Governor Mike Lowry called an emergency session of the legislature in early October with one goal: to hammer out a new funding package for a stadium. A few weeks after the end of the Mariners postseason run, King County Council voted, 10-3, to enact the stadium funding package that the Washington state legislature approved. Although groundbreaking on what would become Safeco Field was still 18 months off, baseball was finally safe in Seattle.

The Mariners would avenge their 1995 American League Championship Series loss to the Indians when they beat them in the 2001 American League Division Series in five games. The Mariners broke the all-time wins record for a team in 2001: however, they failed to make the World Series that season. The franchise had not been back to the playoffs since 2001 until they qualified for the 2022 playoffs.

In July 2019, the MLB Network released MLB Network Presents: The 1995 Mariners, Saving Baseball in Seattle

Indians
In their first World Series appearance since 1954, the Indians lost to the Braves in six games. The Indians returned to the World Series in 1997, but they would lose again to the Florida Marlins in seven games. The Indians remained a World Series contender until the early 2000s, which by that time many of their stars, such as Manny Ramirez, Sandy Alomar, and Jim Thome, had moved on to other teams.

In December 2020, MLB Network Presents: The Dynasty That Almost Was debuted on MLB Network, documenting the Indians run in the mid-to-late 1990s.

References

External links
1995 ALCS at Baseball Reference

American League Championship Series
American League Championship Series
Cleveland Indians postseason
Seattle Mariners postseason
American League Championship Series
American League Championship Series
1990s in Cleveland
American League Championship Series
American League Championship Series
Baseball competitions in Seattle
Baseball competitions in Cleveland